Benjamin William Oliver Swain (March 31, 1986) from Welwyn Garden City is a British synchronized diver. During the Beijing 2008 Summer Olympics, Swain took part in the Men's 3m Springboard Synchronized event with Nicholas Robinson-Baker. Swain and Robinson-Baker were placed seventh at 2008 Summer Olympics in the synchronised 3m springboard event. He won gold in 2009 in the 3m synchro with Robinson-Baker in the World Series leg in Mexico.  He suffered an injury to his anterior cruciate ligament in December 2009 and had an ACL reconstruction in February 2010, ending his season, after which Robinson-Baker partnered with Chris Mears that year.  Swain returned to diving in 2011 but did not make the Olympic team in 2012.

Ben Swain retired in 2012 and became a sport and remedial massage therapist until 2015. Ben married in 2013 in Scotland and in 2015, changed career, successfully training to become an emergency medical technician, working for the NHS ambulance service until moving to Australia in November 2017.

Swain has a Diploma  Sport and Exercise Science from Manchester Metropolitan University  and a degree in Paramedic Science from Flinders University (Adelaide).

References

English divers
Divers at the 2008 Summer Olympics
Olympic divers of Great Britain
1986 births
Living people
Sportspeople from Welwyn Garden City